Reginald Thomas Cleaver (died 1954) was a British cartoonist notable for his work for Punch and The Daily Graphic.

References

External links 

trove.nla.gov.au
artbiogs.co.uk
lookandlearn.com

British cartoonists
Year of birth missing
1954 deaths